RMC may refer to:

 Radio Monte Carlo, a radio station operation in France, Monaco and Italy
 RMC (France), the French version of Radio Monte Carlo
Renal medullary carcinoma
 Rotherham Central railway station by its National Rail code
 Royal Marines Cadets, a family of three cadet corps of the (United Kingdom) Royal Marines
 Russell Midcap Index, a ticker symbol for a Stock market index

Organizations 
 Rajkot Municipal Corporation, municipal corporation of Rajkot, India
 Rajamahendravaram Municipal Corporation, municipal corporation of Rajamahendravaram, India
 Rauma Marine Constructions, a Finnish shipbuilding company based in Rauma, Finland
 Ravenshaw Management Centre, a premier management institute, Cuttack, India
 RMC Group, a construction supplies company based in the United Kingdom
 Rocky Mountain Construction, a roller coaster construction company based in Idaho, United States

Technology
 Rack mount chassis
 Radiative muon capture
 Rigid Metal Conduit, a type of electrical conduit
 Ready-mix concrete
 Reverse Monte Carlo, an inverse mathematical Monte Carlo integration

Colleges
 RMC, Copenhagen Rhythmic Music Conservatory
 Robert Morris College, Chicago
 Rocky Mountain College, Montana
 Rocky Mountain College, Calgary, Alberta
 Royal Military College of Canada, Kingston, Ontario
 Royal Military College, Duntroon, Campbell, Australia
 Royal Military College (Malaysia), Kuala Lumpur, Malaysia
 Royal Military College Saint-Jean, Quebec
 Royal Military College, Sandhurst, near Camberley, Surrey, England
 Randolph–Macon College, Virginia
 Rawalpindi Medical College, Pakistan
 Rajshahi Medical College, Bangladesh
 Rangpur Medical College, Bangladesh